The Disappearance of the Judge is a British silent motion picture of 1919 directed by Alexander Butler.

Plot
A judge is kidnapped by a German gang to steal aero-engine plans. The judge's twin takes his place.

Cast
James Lindsay
Florence Nelson, as Madame Julia 
Mark Melford

References

External links

1919 films
British silent feature films
Films directed by Alexander Butler
British black-and-white films
1910s English-language films